FC Chayka Peschanokopskoye is a Russian football team from Peschanokopskoye.

History
It was founded in 1997. Before the 2016–17 season, it was licensed to play in the third-tier Russian Professional Football League. On 24 May 2019, they secured first place in the South zone of the PFL and their first-ever promotion to the Russian Football National League. On 2 July 2021, Russian Football Union decided to relegate Chaika from FNL back to PFL for the 2021–22 season for fixing games in the 2018–19 season.

Current squad
As of 22 February 2023, according to the official Second League website.

References

External links
 Official Website

Association football clubs established in 1997
Football clubs in Russia
Sport in Rostov Oblast
1997 establishments in Russia